Dean Računica (born 5 December 1969) is a Croatian professional football manager and retired player. He was most recently an assistant manager at Watford to Slaven Bilić.

Playing career
Računica began his career in his hometown Šibenik, where at age 18 became a regular first team player. Then was played for Hajduk Split in the Croatian First League, then later for Austria Salzburg, Hajduk again, for Hapoel Tel Aviv, Hapoel Ironi Rishon LeZion in Israel, and for Chongqing Lifan in China. In 2002 Računica was returned to Hajduk Split, but was ended career due to heart problems. Immediately after the end of his career, Računica has won from Hajduk's fans the Heart of Hajduk Award for 2003–04 season.

International career
For the Croatia national team, Računica capped two games, against Mexico in Zagreb, in 1992, where he scored one goal, and against Slovakia in Bratislava, in 1994.

International goals

Managerial career
After ending his career with Hajduk Split in 2004, Računica spent the next six seasons as an assistant manager of the same club. He then took the head coach job at lower league side Uskok Klis in 2010. In 2012 he took over Junak Sinj, and in 2015 became the assistant manager of Slovak side Dunajská Streda, under the coaching staff of Aljoša Asanović. In 2017 he left Uskok again without leading them for a single match and joined Karabükspor, and later Računica took up a job in Australia, becoming the assistant manager to Asanović at Melbourne Knights.

Since June 2019, Računica works as assistant manager to Slaven Bilić at English club West Bromwich Albion, alongside Danilo Butorović. They led the club to promotion back to the Premier League, finishing runners-up in the 2019–20 EFL Championship season.

Honours

Assistant manager
Hajduk Split
Croatian First League: 2004–05 
Croatian Cup: 2009–10 
Croatian Super Cup: 2005

West Bromwich Albion
EFL Championship runner-up: 2019–20

References

External links
 

1969 births
Living people
Sportspeople from Šibenik
Association football midfielders
Yugoslav footballers
Croatian footballers
Croatia international footballers
HNK Šibenik players
HNK Hajduk Split players
FC Red Bull Salzburg players
Hapoel Tel Aviv F.C. players
Hapoel Rishon LeZion F.C. players
Chongqing Liangjiang Athletic F.C. players
Yugoslav Second League
Croatian Football League players
Austrian Football Bundesliga players
Israeli Premier League players
Chinese Super League players
Croatian expatriate footballers
Expatriate footballers in Austria
Croatian expatriate sportspeople in Austria
Expatriate footballers in Israel
Croatian expatriate sportspeople in Israel
Expatriate footballers in China
Croatian expatriate sportspeople in China
Croatian football managers
HNK Šibenik managers
Croatian Football League managers
HNK Hajduk Split non-playing staff
West Bromwich Albion F.C. non-playing staff
Beijing Guoan F.C. non-playing staff
Watford F.C. non-playing staff
Croatian expatriate sportspeople in Slovakia
Croatian expatriate sportspeople in Australia
Croatian expatriate sportspeople in Saudi Arabia
Croatian expatriate sportspeople in England